Bu ol Qeytas (also Romanized as Bū ol Qeyţās and Bowlqeyţās; also known as Belghitas) is a village in Koleyn Rural District, Fashapuyeh District, Ray County, Tehran Province, Iran. At the 2006 census, its population was 11, in 4 families.

References 

Populated places in Ray County, Iran